Mount Augustus may refer to:

Mount Augustus, Western Australia
Mount Augustus National Park, Western Australia
Mount Augustus, New Zealand